Caelius Vibenna, (Etruscan Caile Vipina, was a noble Etruscan who lived c. 750 BCE (but see below) and brother of Aulus Vibenna (Etruscan Avile Vipina).

Upon arriving at Rome, Vibenna aided Romulus in his wars against Titus Tatius. He and his brother Aulus are also recorded as having aided King Tarquinius Superbus, although Tarquinius Superbus lived some five generations after Romulus.  Tacitus relates  that a certain hill in Rome, previously named Querquetulanus (after the oak trees covering the hill) was renamed the Caelian Hill after Caelius Vibenna.

A burial urn inscribed Arnth Caule Vipina can be found at Deposito de' Dei at Chiusi, Italy.  It is likely that the ashes within belong to a different Etruscan of the same name.

In legend

Caelius and Aulus Vibenna seem to have been well-known figures in Etruscan legend.  Claudius, in a speech to the Senate referred to the 'adventures' of Caelius Vibenna and his companion 'Mastarna', whom Claudius equates with Servius Tullius.  Claudius claimed that Mastarna left Etruria with the remnants of Caelius' army and occupied the Caelian Hill, naming it after Vibenna.

The François Tomb at Vulci contains a scene showing Caelius and Aulus Vibenna taking part in one of these adventures. The scene appears to show Caelius and Aulus Vibenna and Mastarna with companions named 'Larth Ulthes', 'Rasce' and 'Marce Camitlnas'.  These figures are shown slaughtering foes named as 'Laris Papathnas Velznach', 'Pesna Aremsnas Sveamach', 'Venthical[...]plsachs' and 'Cneve Tarchunies Rumach' (interpreted as 'Gnaeus Tarquinius of Rome').  It appears that the group of foes had taken Caelius, Aulus, Mastarna, Rasce and Marce Camitlnas prisoner, but while they were sleeping, Larth Ulthes crept into their camp armed with swords which he gave to his companions.  The erstwhile prisoners are shown killing their former captors.  Mastarna is shown freeing Caelius Vibenna.

References

Sources

 

 

 

 

8th-century BC Romans
Etruscans
Etruscan mythology